The 2006 European Judo Championships were the 17th edition of the European Judo Championships, and were held in Tampere, Finland between 25 and 28 May 2006.

Medal overview

Men

Women

Medals table

Results overview

Men

60 kg

66 kg

73 kg

81 kg

90 kg

100 kg

+100 kg

Women

48 kg

52 kg

57 kg

63 kg

70 kg

78 kg

+78 kg

References

External links
 
 Results (International Judo Federation)

 
E
Judo Championships
European Judo Championships
Judo
Sports competitions in Tampere
Judo competitions in Finland
May 2006 sports events in Europe